Stanley Lewis Engerman (born March 14, 1936) is an economist and economic historian at the University of Rochester. He received his Ph.D. in economics in 1962 from Johns Hopkins University. Engerman is known for his quantitative historical work along with Nobel Prize–winning economist Robert Fogel. His first major book, co-authored with Robert Fogel in 1974, was Time on the Cross: The Economics of American Negro Slavery. This significant work, winner of the Bancroft Prize in American history, challenged readers to think critically about the economics of slavery. Engerman has also published over 100 articles and has authored, co-authored or edited 16 book-length studies.

Engerman served as president of the Social Science History Association as well as president of the Economic History Association. He is professor of Economics and Professor of History at the University of Rochester, where he teaches classes in economic history and the economics of sports and entertainment.  From 2009 to 2012 he was a visiting professor in the Harvard University Economics Department, where he taught the economics of sports and entertainment.

Professor Engerman has taught many influential individuals, including Evelyn Brooks Higginbotham, David Eltis, Gary Gorton, Evelyn Jennings, Art Laffer, Frank Lewis, Jeremy Lin and Robert L. Paquette.  The former National Economic Council executive for the Trump administration, Larry Kudlow has described Dr. Engerman as the most impactful educator in his studies (although Dr. Engerman professes to have no recollection of ever teaching Mr. Kudlow).

Time on the Cross
The critical reception of Engerman's most widely read work, Time on the Cross: The Economics of American Negro Slavery (co-authored with Robert Fogel) was unique in its public visibility.  Reminiscent of Charles A. Beard's economic analysis of the Constitution in its longevity, Time on the Cross made a variety of politically-charged claims based on cliometric quantitative methods.  Fogel and Engerman claimed that slavery remained an economically viable institution and slave ownership was generally a profitable investment, slave agriculture was very efficient, and the material conditions of the lives of slaves "compared favorably with those of free industrial workers."

Charles Crowe offered a summary of the work: "The cliometricians announced the scientific discovery of a vastly different South led by confident and effective slaveowning entrepreneurs firmly wedded to handsome profits from a booming economy with high per capita incomes and an efficiency ratio 35 per- cent greater than that of free Northern agriculture. In the new dispensation the efficient, often highly skilled, and very productive slaves embraced the Protestant work ethic and prudish Victorian morals, avoided both promiscuity and substantial sexual exploitation by planters, lived in father-headed and stable nuclear families, kept 90 percent of the fruits of their labor, and enjoyed one of the best sets of material conditions in the world for working class people."

Research with Kenneth L. Sokoloff
Engerman co-authored an article entitled "History Lessons: Institutions, Factor Endowments, and Paths of Development in the New World" with Kenneth Sokoloff, which can be found in The Journal of Economic Perspectives.  Sokoloff and Engerman go in-depth and argue that the economic trajectory of former New World colonies over the past 300 years was largely determined by various facets of their natural environments.  Sokoloff and Engerman focus mainly on the effects of the colonies' soil qualities.  Sokoloff and Engerman claim that in areas such as Cuba which possessed land suitable for sugar and coffee, the soil quality led to economies of scale and plantation agriculture and slave labor.  This in turn led to a guarded franchise, high tax rates, and limits on education.  In areas such as the United States which possessed land suitable for wheat, the soil quality led to small scale farming and relatively equal distributions of wealth.  This in turn led to an open franchise and broad public education.  Sokoloff and Engerman conclude that areas such as the United States, which emphasized equality and access to public education, were able to progress faster economically than areas such as Cuba which did not allow such opportunities to its residents.

Works
 Time on the Cross: The Economics of American Negro Slavery (with Robert Fogel), 1974
 Race and Slavery in the Western Hemisphere: Quantitative Studies by Eugene D. Genovese and Stanley L. Engerman, 1975 
 A Historical Guide to World Slavery by Seymour Drescher and Stanley L. Engerman (1998)
 Slavery, Emancipation, and Freedom: Comparative Perspectives (Walter Lynwood Fleming Lectures in Southern History) by Stanley L. Engerman (2007)
 Slavery (Oxford Readers) by Stanley Engerman, Seymour Drescher, and Robert Paquette (2001)
 The Evolution of Suffrage Institutions in the New World SL ENGERMAN, KL SOKOLOFF - The Journal of Economic History, 2005 - Cambridge Univ Press
 Institutional and Non-Institutional Explanations of Economic Differences SL ENGERMAN, KL SOKOLOFF - NBER Working Paper, 2003
 Economic Development in the Americas since 1500: Endowments and Institutions by Stanley L. Engerman and Kenneth L. Sokoloff, 2011

Notes

References

External links
 Thomas Weiss review essay on Fogel and Engerman's Time on the Cross
 

Economic historians
1936 births
Living people
Historians of the Southern United States
University of Rochester faculty
20th-century American economists
21st-century American economists
Johns Hopkins University alumni
Academics of the University of Cambridge
Harvard University faculty
Distinguished Fellows of the American Economic Association
Bancroft Prize winners
Presidents of the Economic History Association